Monica Svensson (born December 26, 1978) is a  retired race walker from Sweden. She represented her native country at the 2003 World Championships in Paris, France, where she ended up in 27th place in the women's 20 km walk event. She was credited with the world best time in 50 km walk before the event got official recognition.

Achievements

References

Specific

1978 births
Living people
Swedish female racewalkers
World Athletics Championships athletes for Sweden